The Inns of Court Officers Training Corps Memorial is a First World War memorial near Berkhamsted, in the west of Hertfordshire. It is now on land that forms part of Berkhamsted Golf Course.  The stone obelisk was erected c.1920, close to the temporary training camp of the corps on Berkhamsted Common which operated from 1914 to 1919. It became a Grade II listed building in November 2016.

Background
The Inns of Court Officers Training Corps (OTC) was a Territorial Army unit based in Chancery Lane in London, near the headquarters of the Law Society of England and Wales and adjacent to Lincoln's Inn.  The corps was closely associated with the legal profession, and its cap badge combined the arms of the four Inns of Court.

The Inns of Court OTC expanded rapidly in August and September 1914, as thousands volunteered for military service following the outbreak of the First World War, and the corps quickly outgrew its peacetime premises in London. A training camp opened in tents on Berkhamsted Common, in the west of Hertfordshire in September 1914 and remained in operation until June 1919, hosting around 2,000 officer cadets.

Around 11,000 were commissioned and became officers in other units. Three were awarded the Victoria Cross, all posthumously: Jack Harrison of the East Yorkshire Regiment in 1917, Walter Napleton Stone of the Royal Fusiliers in 1918 and Christopher Bushell of the Royal West Surrey Regiment in 1918.

Memorial

The memorial was erected c. 1920, comprising a stone obelisk standing on a square stone pedestal and base with two steps.  The upper surface of the top step around the pedestal is inlaid with red bricks in eight triangular elements divided by white stone bands, forming a pattern which resembles Saint George's Cross overlaid with Saint Patrick's Saltire.

The pedestal bears the inscription:

This is followed by the Latin motto of the corps:

A later inscription on the base of the pedestal commemorates Lieutenant Colonel Francis Errington (1854–1942), who commanded the Inns of Court OTC from 1913 to 1916 and who published a history of the corps in 1922:

See also
Lincoln's Inn War Memorial, London

References

External links

 Inns of Court Officers Training Corps Memorial, Berkhamsted Common, National Heritage List for England, Historic England
 In search of the Inns of Court trenches, Michael Cross, Law Gazette, 2 July 2014
 The Inns of Court Officers Training Corps during the Great War, Francis Errington, 1922
 The Inns of Court OTC Regiment, The Dacorum Heritage Trust
 Never such innocence again: Berkhamsted's First World War training camp, Hertfordshire Life, 18 August 2014
 Inns Of Court Officers Training Corps Imperial War Museum War Memorials Register
 Roll of Honour
 The Inns of Court OTC at Berkhamsted

Grade II listed buildings in Hertfordshire
Grade II listed monuments and memorials
Monuments and memorials in Hertfordshire
World War I memorials in England
Inns of Court